Mount Field is a mountain located about  northeast of the town of Field in Yoho National Park, Canada. The mountain was named in 1884 after Cyrus West Field,  an American merchant who had laid the first Atlantic cable, 1858, a second in 1866; Mr. Field was visiting the Canadian Rockies the year as a guest of the CPR who were building the national railway, at the naming of a station and a mountain. Precipitation runoff from Mount Field drains into the Kicking Horse River. Topographic relief is significant as the summit rises 1,360 meters (4,462 feet) above the river in two kilometers (1.2 mile). The Trans-Canada Highway (Highway 1) traverses the southern foot of the mountain.

Geology

Mount Field is composed of sedimentary rock laid down during the Precambrian to Jurassic periods. Formed in shallow seas, this sedimentary rock was pushed east and over the top of younger rock during the Laramide orogeny. The Burgess Shale is located below the ridge connecting Mt. Field to Wapta Mountain.

Climate

Based on the Köppen climate classification, Mount Field is located in a subarctic climate zone with cold, snowy winters, and mild summers. Winter temperatures can drop below −20 °C with wind chill factors below −30 °C.

See also

Geography of British Columbia

References

External links
Mount Field in the Canadian Mountain Encyclopedia.
Cyrus W. Field at the Atlantic Cable history website.
 Weather: Mount Field

Two-thousanders of British Columbia
Canadian Rockies
Columbia Country
Mountains of Yoho National Park
Kootenay Land District